Air Rhodesia Flight 827, the Umniati, was a scheduled civilian flight between Kariba and Salisbury, Rhodesia (now Zimbabwe) that was shot down soon after takeoff on 12 February 1979 by Zimbabwe People's Revolutionary Army (ZIPRA) guerrillas using a Strela 2 missile.  The circumstances were very similar to the shooting down of Air Rhodesia Flight 825 five months earlier.  it remains the deadliest aviation incident in Rhodesia/Zimbabwe.

Incident description
The flight's departure from Kariba had been delayed, and so it did not take the time to climb over a lake to get above the ceiling of shoulder-launched anti-aircraft missiles before heading for Salisbury. ZIPRA had information that the Rhodesian Security Forces Commander General Peter Walls was on board, and they tried to assassinate him. However, he and his wife missed the flight and caught a later one, which landed safely in Salisbury.

The plane was damaged by a SAM-7 missile and came down in rough terrain in the Vuti African Purchase Area east of Lake Kariba. None of the 59 passengers or crew survived.

Aftermath
Following the second incident, Air Rhodesia added shrouding to the exhaust pipes of their Viscount aircraft to reduce their infrared signature, and painted the aircraft with a low-radiation paint as countermeasures against heat-seeking missiles.

On 25 February 1979, the Rhodesian Air Force, with covert assistance from the South African Air Force, launched Operation Vanity, a retaliatory bombing raid against a ZIPRA camp near Livingstone, Zambia.

References

827
20th-century aircraft shootdown incidents
1979 in Rhodesia
Accidents and incidents involving the Vickers Viscount
Airliner shootdown incidents
Aviation accidents and incidents in 1979
Aviation accidents and incidents in Rhodesia
February 1979 events in Africa
Mass murder in 1979
Rhodesian Bush War
Terrorism in Rhodesia
Terrorist incidents in Zimbabwe
Massacres in Rhodesia